Jaiye Abidoye (born 11 May 1942) is a Nigerian middle-distance runner. He competed in the men's 800 metres at the 1972 Summer Olympics.

References

External links

1942 births
Living people
Athletes (track and field) at the 1970 British Commonwealth Games
Athletes (track and field) at the 1972 Summer Olympics
Athletes (track and field) at the 1974 British Commonwealth Games
Nigerian male middle-distance runners
Olympic athletes of Nigeria
Place of birth missing (living people)
Commonwealth Games competitors for Nigeria